Shekhandeh is a village in Upper Chitral District, Khyber Pakhtunkhwa in Pakistan.  It is named after the native Nuristani people, who are the speakers of the Shekhani dialect of Kamkata-vari language.

References

Populated places in Chitral District